Dr. P. Selvie Das (1932–2021) is a former Indian educationist and parliamentarian.

Dr. Das was the Vice-Chancellor of the University of Mysore (1988–1991) and a member of the Union Public Service Commission (1991–1997). She was nominated to the Rajya Sabha in 1997 and served till 2003.

Das died in 2021 from COVID-19.

References

Sources
Brief Biodata

Nominated members of the Rajya Sabha
1932 births
University of Mysore
2021 deaths
Deaths from the COVID-19 pandemic in India